Howaldt is a German family name.

 August Howaldt, founder of the German shipyard Howaldtswerke
 Georg Ferdinand Howaldt, German sculptor, brother of August Howaldt
 Hans Howaldt, submarine commander and grandson of August Howaldt

References 

 Christian Ostersehlte: Von Howaldt zu HDW. Koehlers Verlagsgesellschaft mbH, Hamburg 2004, 
 
 
 Deutsches Geschlechterbuch, vol. 91 (1936), p. 237 ff.
 Howaldt in: Biographisches Lexikon für Schleswig-Holstein und Lübeck, vol. 12 Neumünster 2006, p. 198 ff. 

German families